Seastories is the second studio album by actress Minnie Driver, released in 2007. The album features collaborations with Ryan Adams, Neal Casal and Liz Phair. The album peaked at 25 on Billboards Top Heatseekers Chart.

Track listing
 "Stars & Satellites"
 "Sorry Baby"
 "Beloved"
 "Cold Dark River"
 "Mockingbird"
 "How to Be Good"
 "King Without a Queen"
 "Mary"
 "Lakewater Hair"
 "London Skies"
 "Coming Back to Life"
 "Love Is Love"
 "Complicated Man"

2007 albums
Minnie Driver albums
Zoë Records albums
Rounder Records albums
Decca Records albums